Aaron Allan Slegers (born September 4, 1992) is an American former professional baseball pitcher. He played college baseball at Indiana University Bloomington for the Indiana Hoosiers and in Major League Baseball (MLB) for the Minnesota Twins, Tampa Bay Rays, and Los Angeles Angels.

Career
Slegers attended Notre Dame Preparatory High School in Scottsdale, Arizona. He pitched for the school's baseball team, spending most of his junior year on the junior varsity team. He enrolled at Indiana University Bloomington, where he made the Indiana Hoosiers baseball team as a walk-on. He threw one inning before he suffered a broken wrist when hit by a line drive. The next year, he had a stress fracture in his right tibia. His injuries limited him to throwing  total innings in his freshman and sophomore years. In 2013, his junior year, Slegers helped Indiana win the Big Ten Conference's regular-season championship and the conference tournament, and Indiana appeared in the 2013 NCAA Division I baseball tournament. He was named the Big Ten Conference Baseball Pitcher of the Year after going 9–2 with a 2.04 ERA.

Minnesota Twins
The Minnesota Twins selected Slegers in the fifth round of the 2013 Major League Baseball draft. He signed with the Twins, receiving a $380,000 signing bonus. He made his professional debut that year with the Elizabethton Twins of the Rookie-level Appalachian League, compiling a 0.47 ERA in 19 innings pitched. He began the 2014 season with the Cedar Rapids Kernels of the Class A Midwest League, and was promoted to the Fort Myers Miracle of the Class A-Advanced Florida State League in July. In 23 total starts between both clubs, he pitched to a combined 9–8 record with a 4.53 ERA. He returned to Fort Myers in 2015, and after pitching to an 8–6 record and a 2.87 ERA in 19 starts, he was promoted to the Chattanooga Lookouts of the Class AA Southern League in August. In six starts for the Lookouts, he was 1–4 with a 4.91 ERA. He pitched for Chattanooga in 2016 and compiled a 10–7 record with a 3.41 ERA in 25 starts.

The Twins invited him to spring training as a non-roster player in 2017. He began the season with the Rochester Red Wings of the Class AAA International League. 

On August 17, 2017, Slegers made his major league debut for the Twins. He was optioned back to Rochester the next day, and was recalled on September 4. In 24 starts for Rochester he was 15–4 with a 3.40 ERA, and in four games (three starts) for Minnesota, he was 0–1 with a 6.46 ERA. Slegers began 2018 with Rochester and was recalled by the Twins on April 26.

Slegers was designated for assignment on January 3, 2019.

Pittsburgh Pirates
On January 11, 2019, Slegers was claimed off waivers by the Pittsburgh Pirates. Slegers was designated for assignment on March 28, 2019, after the contracts of Melky Cabrera, Francisco Liriano, and J. B. Shuck were selected.

Tampa Bay Rays
On March 30, 2019, Slegers was traded to the Tampa Bay Rays in exchange for cash considerations. On May 16, 2019, Slegers was designated for assignment by the Rays without appearing in an MLB game for them. On August 21, the Rays selected his contract. On September 2, Slegers was designated for assignment. He elected free agency on October 1, but later re-signed with the Rays on a minor league deal in the offseason. On June 28, 2020, Tampa Bay named Slegers to the Port Charlotte team as part of their 60-man roster for the shortened 2020 season. On August 12, Slegers was selected to the active roster. In 2020, Slegers recorded a 3.46 ERA in 11 regular season appearances, and pitched to a strong 1.80 ERA in five innings across three playoff games.

Los Angeles Angels
On February 8, 2021, the Rays traded Slegers to the Los Angeles Angels in exchange for a player to be named later. Slegers appeared in 29 games for the Angels, struggling to a 6.97 ERA with 25 strikeouts. On August 28, Slegers was sent outright to the Triple-A Salt Lake Bees, however elected free agency the next day.

Tampa Bay Rays (second stint)
On August 31, 2021, Slegers signed a two-year minor league deal with the Tampa Bay Rays. He elected free agency on November 10, 2022.

On January 19, 2023, Slegers announced his retirement from baseball due to continuing shoulder injury problems.

Personal life
His older sister, Rebecca, played volleyball at Lehigh University.

References

External links

1992 births
Living people
Baseball players from Scottsdale, Arizona
Major League Baseball pitchers
Minnesota Twins players
Tampa Bay Rays players
Los Angeles Angels players
Indiana Hoosiers baseball players
Elizabethton Twins players
Cedar Rapids Kernels players
Fort Myers Miracle players
Chattanooga Lookouts players
Rochester Red Wings players
Durham Bulls players
Salt Lake Bees players